Évelyne Didier (born 14 March 1948) was a member of the Senate of France.

French Senate
She has represented the Meurthe-et-Moselle department.

Party Membership
She is a member of the Communist, Republican, and Citizen Group.

Other positions held 
 Mayor of Conflans-en-Jarnisy since 2008.
 Counsel-general for Meurthe-et-Moselle, and for the canton of Conflans-en-Jarnisy.

References
Home page
Page on the Senate website

1948 births
Living people
French Senators of the Fifth Republic
Women members of the Senate (France)
Women mayors of places in France
21st-century French women politicians
Senators of Meurthe-et-Moselle
French Communist Party politicians
Mayors of places in Grand Est